Sepalcure is the full-length self-titled debut album from the Brooklyn, New York duo Sepalcure, consisting of Travis Stewart, better known as machinedrum, and Praveen Sharma.  Pitchfork placed the album at number 47 on its list of the "Top 50 albums of 2011".

Track listing
"Me" 		4:25
"Pencil Pimp" 		6:01
"The One" 		5:40
"See Me Feel Me" 		5:01
"Eternally Yrs" 		5:10
"Yuh Nuh See" 		5:15
"Breezin" 		6:39
"Hold On" 		4:29
"Carrot Man" 		5:02
"Outside" 		4:22

References

External links

2011 debut albums
Hotflush Recordings albums